Loose Ends is a 1930 British drama film directed by Norman Walker and starring Edna Best, Owen Nares and Miles Mander. It was made at Elstree Studios.

Cast
 Edna Best as Nina Grant  
 Owen Nares as Malcolm Ferres  
 Miles Mander as Raymond Carteret  
 Adrianne Allen as Brenda Fallon  
 Donald Calthrop as Winton Penner  
 Edna Davies as Deborah Price  
 Sybil Arundale as Sally Britt  
 J. Fisher White as Stranger  
 Gerard Lyley as Cyril Gayling

References

Bibliography
 Low, Rachael. Filmmaking in 1930s Britain. George Allen & Unwin, 1985.
 Wood, Linda. British Films, 1927-1939. British Film Institute, 1986.

External links

1930 films
British drama films
1930 drama films
1930s English-language films
Films shot at British International Pictures Studios
Films directed by Norman Walker
Films set in England
British black-and-white films
1930s British films